KTWA (92.7 FM) is a radio station licensed to serve the community of Ottumwa, Iowa. The station is owned by Greg List, through licensee O-Town Communications, Inc. It airs an adult contemporary music format.

The station was assigned the KTWA call letters by the Federal Communications Commission on July 18, 1983.

References

External links
KTWA official website
Ottumwa Radio - O-Town Communications, Inc.

TWA
Mainstream adult contemporary radio stations in the United States
Radio stations established in 1985
1985 establishments in Iowa